Saginaw Correctional Facility (SRF) is a Michigan prison, located in Tittabawassee Township, for adult male inmates.

Facility
The facility has seven housing units used for Michigan Department of Corrections male prisoners 18 years of age and older. Three of the housing units are used for Level II prisoners, three other housing units are used for Level IV (higher security level) prisoners, and one house unit is used for Level I (lowest security level) prisoners. Onsite facilities provide for foodservice, health care, facility maintenance, and prison administration.

Security
The facility is surrounded by double  fences with razor-ribbon wire. A third fence was added in 1996, and two gun towers were added in 1997. Electronic detection systems, closed-circuit television, and armed patrol vehicles are also utilized to maintain perimeter security 24/7.

Services
The facility offers libraries, education programs, and religious services. It is designated as a Michigan Prisoner ReEntry Initiative (MPRI) In-Reach facility. Onsite medical care is supplemented by local hospitals and the Duane L. Waters Hospital in Jackson, Michigan.

Notable Inmates
Adam Shigwadja - Shigwadja was sentenced to 175 months to 30 years in prison for first-degree home invasion and second-degree arson in the Sept. 15, 2014 attack on his ex-girlfriend Sophia Putney-Wilcox. Was profiled on CBS's 48 Hours.
Monk Steppenwolf - Serial killer sentenced to life without parole.

See also

 List of Michigan state prisons

References

External links
 
 Michigan Department of Corrections

1993 establishments in Michigan
Buildings and structures in Gratiot County, Michigan
Prisons in Michigan